William Southwell (1669 – 23 January 1720) was an Irish politician and British Army officer.

Background
He was the third son of Richard Southwell of Castle Matrix, Co. Limerick, and his wife Lady Elizabeth O'Brien, daughter of Murrough O'Brien, 1st Earl of Inchiquin. His older brothers were Thomas Southwell, 1st Baron Southwell and Richard Southwell. During the Glorious Revolution of 1689, he and his brother were attainted by the parliament of King James II of England.

Career
Southwell entered the British Army under King William III of England in 1693. During the Nine Years' War, he was wounded at the 2nd Siege of Namur in 1695 and was afterwards promoted to captain. In the War of the Spanish Succession, he took part in the Battle of Cádiz and Battle of Vigo Bay as major of the 6th Foot in 1702. He was promoted to lieutenant-colonel a year later. Southwell commanded four hundred grenadiers in the 1st Siege of Barcelona in 1705 and was made colonel of the 6th Regiment of Foot the following year. He sold his colonelcy to Thomas Harrison in 1708 and was appointed captain of the Battleaxe Guards in 1714, protecting the Lord Lieutenant of Ireland.

He was elected to the Irish House of Commons for Kinsale in 1703, representing the constituency until 1713. Subsequently, Southwell sat for Castlemartyr until 1715 and then for Baltimore until his death in 1720.

Family
In 1709, he married Lucy Bowen, younger daughter of William Bowen, of Ballyadams, Co. Laois, a grandson of Sir William Domville, Attorney General for Ireland. By her he had six sons and nine daughters. His third son, and eventual heir, Bowen was a Member of Parliament for Downpatrick.

References

 

1669 births
1720 deaths
Politicians from County Limerick
Irish soldiers in the British Army
17th-century Irish people
Members of the Parliament of Ireland (pre-1801) for County Cork constituencies
Irish MPs 1703–1713
Irish MPs 1713–1714
Irish MPs 1715–1727
Military personnel from County Limerick